Elizabeth Carrington Morris (7 July 1795 – 12 February 1865) was an American botanist, and an expert on the flora of Philadelphia. With her sister, Margaretta Morris, she has been credited by historian Catherine McNeur as helping to transform American science in the 19th century.

Life 

Elizabeth Carrington Morris was born in Philadelphia in on 7 July 1795, the daughter of Ann Willing Morris (1767–1853) and Luke Morris (1760–1802) of Germantown. Elizabeth and her sister, Margaretta, used the back garden of the family home in Germantown to observe and study insects and plants. This was described by Samuel Hotchkin in Ancient and Modern Germantown, Mount Airy and Chestnut Hill (1889):The garden, so protected by its trees and shrubbery as to retain the attractions of its original seclusion, was for many years the beautiful scene of the scientific researches of Miss Elizabeth Carrington Morris, who, retiring in disposition, was an accomplished botanist, and numbered among her many scientific correspondents Dr. William Huttall, Dr. William C. Darlington, of West Chester, and Dr. Asa Gray, of Cambridge, Massachusetts. Her collection of rare plants, cultivated and preserved, was celebrated among many, whose refined taste led them to pursue with her this course of study. Her garden was her Eden, and the greenhouses of Messrs. Thomas Meehan and Henry C. Waltemate, were her favorite resorts.The Morris sisters had a wide circle of correspondents, which included botanist Asa Gray and social reformer Dorothea Dix. Both Elizabeth and Margaretta contributed articles to scientific journals using pseudonyms, and though Margaretta later began to use her real initials, Elizabeth remained anonymous. In the words of historian Catherine McNeur, she 'preferred anonymity to accolades'. Nevertheless, she established a reputation for herself as an expert in the flora of Philadelphia: authoring articles, supplying plants to the country’s leading botanists, and creating illustrations for scientific books and articles.

Elizabeth Carrington Morris died at home in Germantown on 12 February 1865 and was buried at Saint Luke's Episcopal Churchyard.

References 

1795 births
1865 deaths
American women botanists
19th-century women scientists
People from Pennsylvania